Ranajit Guha (born 23 May 1923, in Siddhakati, Backergunje) is a historian of the Indian Subcontinent who has been vastly influential in the Subaltern Studies group, and was the editor of several of the group's early anthologies. He migrated from India to the UK in 1959, and was a reader in history at the University of Sussex. He currently lives in Purkersdorf, Austria on the edge of the Vienna Woods, with his German-born wife Mechthild Guha, née Jungwirth, herself a leading scholar of subaltern studies, whom he met at the University of Sussex in the early 1960s, where Guha rose to prominence, and then moved to the Australian National University where both continued their work. 

His Elementary Aspects of Peasant Insurgency in Colonial India is widely considered to be a classic. Aside from this, his founding statement in the first volume of Subaltern Studies set the agenda for the Subaltern Studies group, defining the "subaltern" as "the demographic difference between the total Indian population and all those whom we have described as the ‘elite’."

Work 
The main historiographical issues, addressed in Guha's work are (a) the colonial appropriation of the Indian past and its representation as a “highly interesting portion of British history,” which together with the force of colonial conquest added up in Guha’s terminology to a colonial expropriation of Indian history; (b) the complicity of all branches of colonialist knowledge in the fact or force of conquest; (c) British rule in India as a “dominance without hegemony,” in which the moment of coercion outweighed the moment of persuasion by contrast with western Europe; (d) an Indian historiography of India that attempts to redress the expropriation of Indian history and make “the Indian people, constituted as a nation, the subject of their own history”; (e) a subaltern historiography that identifies the limitations of the mainstream Indian historiography of India and the need to pay attention to the “neglected dimension of subaltern autonomy in action, consciousness and culture,” the “contribution made by the people on their own”; and (f) a historiography that goes beyond “statism” to the everyday being-in-the-world of ordinary people, countering the pretensions of the “prose of world-history” with the “prose of the world.” These issues recur in various forms and combinations in Guha’s books and essays, notably the ones he contributed to Subaltern Studies, an edited series that he launched in 1982.

The theoretical influences on Guha’s work are not limited to Marxism and its many offshoots. Guha used the concept of “subaltern” to signify anyone in India who did not belong to the “elite” and therefore included peasants, workers, impoverished landlords, and others whose behavior exhibited a combination of defiance and deference to the elite. It has many points of contact with Gramsci’s work. Guha drew freely on the philosophy of Hegel and Heidegger, Bengali literature, notably the works of Rabindranath Tagore, not to mention semiotics, linguistics, structuralism, and poststructuralism, the objective being not theoretical monism or purity but the mobilization of a wide range of references to shed light on history’s dark corners.

The eclectic richness, if not elusiveness, of the concept of “subaltern” and Guha’s deployment of it in various forms to speak to caste, class, and gender issues has perhaps inspired its wider diffusion for rethinking the history of popular consciousness and mobilization in fields as far apart as Asian, African, and Latin American history.

Bibliography

Author
A rule of property for Bengal : an essay on the idea of permanent settlement, Paris [etc.] : Mouton & Co., 1963, New edition: Duke University Press, 
Elementary Aspects of Peasant Insurgency in Colonial India, Oxford University Press, Delhi, 1983, New edition: Duke Univ Press, 1999,  -  a classic of Subaltern Studies
Guha, Ranajit, "History at the Limit of World-History" (Italian Academy Lectures), Columbia University Press 2002
An Indian Historiography of India: A Nineteenth Century Agenda & Its Implications. Calcutta: K.P. Bagchi & Company. 1988.
Dominance without Hegemony: History and Power in Colonial India, Harvard University Press, 1998
The Small Voice of History, Permanent Black, 2009

Editor
(with Gayatri Chakravorty Spivak), Selected Subaltern Studies, New York: Oxford University Press, 1988
A Subaltern Studies Reader,1986-1995, Univ of Minnesota Press, 1997,

Articles
 The Prose of Counter-Insurgency

Works about Guha
 Sathyamurthy, T. V. "Indian Peasant Historiography: A Critical Perspective on Ranajit Guha's Work." In: Journal of Peasant Studies (October 1990) vol.18, no.1, pp. 93–143.
 Ranajit Guha's Biography written by Shahid Amin and Gautam Bhadra and the complete bibliography compiled by Gautam Bhadra are available in Subaltern Studies Volume VIII edited by David Arnold and David Hardiman, OUP, 1994.

See also
 Subaltern Studies
 Partha Chatterjee
 Vivek Chibber

References

External links
An Analysis of the essay "On Some Aspects of the Historiography of Colonial India"

1923 births
Bengali historians
Historians of South Asia
20th-century Indian historians
Living people
Recipients of the Ananda Purashkar
Indian Marxist historians
People from Barisal